A potentially hazardous object (PHO) is a near-Earth object – either an asteroid or a comet – with an orbit that can make close approaches to the Earth and which is large enough to cause significant regional damage in the event of impact. More than 99% of the known potentially hazardous objects are no impact threat over the next 100 years. , just 17 of the known potentially hazardous objects listed on the Sentry Risk Table could not be excluded as potential threats over the next hundred years. Over hundreds if not thousands of years though, the orbits of some "potentially hazardous" asteroids can  evolve to live up to their namesake.

Most of these objects are potentially hazardous asteroids (PHAs), and a few are comets.  there are 2,304 known PHAs (about 8% of the total near-Earth population), of which 153 are estimated to be larger than one kilometer in diameter (see list of largest PHAs below). Most of the discovered PHAs are Apollo asteroids (1,965) and fewer belong to the group of Aten asteroids (185).

A potentially hazardous object can be known not to be a threat to Earth for the next 100 years or more, if its orbit is reasonably well determined. Potentially hazardous asteroids with some threat of impacting Earth in the next 100 years are listed on the Sentry Risk Table. , only 17 potentially hazardous asteroids are listed on the Sentry Risk Table. Most potentially hazardous asteroids are ruled out as hazardous to at least several hundreds of years when their competing best orbit models are sufficiently constrained, but recent discoveries whose orbital constraints are little-known have divergent or incomplete mechanical models until observation yields further data. After several astronomical surveys, the number of known PHAs has increased tenfold since the end of the 1990s (see bar charts below). The Minor Planet Center's website List of the Potentially Hazardous Asteroids also publishes detailed information for these objects. 

In May 2021, NASA astronomers reported that 5 to 10 years of preparation may be needed to avoid a potential impactor based on a simulated exercise conducted by the 2021 Planetary Defense Conference.

Overview 

An object is considered a PHO if its minimum orbit intersection distance (MOID) with respect to Earth is less than  – approximately 19.5 lunar distances – and its absolute magnitude is brighter than 22, approximately corresponding to a diameter above . This is big enough to cause regional devastation to human settlements unprecedented in human history in the case of a land impact, or a major tsunami in the case of an ocean impact. Such impact events occur on average around once per 10,000 years. NEOWISE data estimates that there are 4,700 ± 1,500 potentially hazardous asteroids with a diameter greater than 100 meters.

Levels of hazard 

The two main scales used to categorize the impact hazards of asteroids are the Palermo Technical Impact Hazard Scale and the Torino scale.

Potentially hazardous comets 

Short-period comets currently with an Earth-MOID less than 0.05 AU include: 109P/Swift-Tuttle, 55P/Tempel–Tuttle, 15P/Finlay, 289P/Blanpain, 255P/Levy, 206P/Barnard–Boattini, 21P/Giacobini–Zinner, and 73P/Schwassmann–Wachmann.

Numbers 

In 2012 NASA estimated 20 to 30 percent of these objects have been found. During an asteroid's close approaches to planets or moons other than the Earth, it will be subject to gravitational perturbation, modifying its orbit, and potentially changing a previously non-threatening asteroid into a PHA or vice versa. This is a reflection of the dynamic character of the Solar System.

Several astronomical survey projects such as Lincoln Near-Earth Asteroid Research, Catalina Sky Survey and Pan-STARRS continue to search for more PHOs. Each one found is studied by various means, including optical, radar, and infrared to determine its characteristics, such as size, composition, rotation state, and to more accurately determine its orbit. Both professional and amateur astronomers participate in such observation and tracking.

Size 

Asteroids larger than approximately 35 meters across can pose a threat to a town or city. However the diameter of most small asteroids is not well determined, as it is usually only estimated based on their brightness and distance, rather than directly measured, e.g. from radar observations. For this reason NASA and the Jet Propulsion Laboratory use the more practical measure of absolute magnitude (H). Any asteroid with an absolute magnitude of 22.0 or brighter is assumed to be of the required size.

Only a coarse estimation of size can be found from the object's magnitude because an assumption must be made for its albedo which is also not usually known for certain. The NASA near-Earth object program uses an assumed albedo of 0.14 for this purpose. In May 2016, the asteroid size estimates arising from the Wide-field Infrared Survey Explorer and NEOWISE missions have been questioned. Although the early original criticism had not undergone peer review, a more recent peer-reviewed study was subsequently published.

Largest PHAs 

With a mean diameter of approximately 7 kilometers, Apollo asteroid  is likely the largest known potentially hazardous object, despite its fainter absolute magnitude of 15.2, compared to other listed objects in the table below (note: calculated mean-diameters in table are inferred from the object's brightness and its (assumed) albedo. They are only an approximation.). The lowest numbered PHA is 1566 Icarus.

Statistics 

Below is a list of the largest PHAs (based on absolute magnitude H) discovered in a given year. Historical data of the cumulative number of discovered PHA since 1999 are displayed in the bar charts—one for the total number and the other for objects larger than one kilometer. PHAs brighter than absolute magnitude 17.75 are likely larger than 1 km in size.

Gallery

See also 

 Asteroid impact avoidance
 Earth-grazing fireball
 Global catastrophic risk
 List of asteroid close approaches to Earth
 ; short term warnings

Notes

References

External links 
 Sentry: Earth Impact Monitoring (current) (NASA NEO Program)
 Very Close Approaches (<0.01 AU) of PHAs to Earth 1900-2200
 TECA Table of Asteroids Next Closest Approaches to the Earth, Sormano Astronomical Observatory
 MBPL - Minor Body Priority List (PHA Asteroids), Sormano Astronomical Observatory
 Responding to the Threat of Potentially-Hazardous Near Earth Objects (PDF)
 Risk of comet hitting Earth is greater than previously thought, say researchers, The Guardian, 22 December 2015
 Conversion of Absolute Magnitude to Diameter, Minor Planet Center

Minor Planet Center  
 List of the Potentially Hazardous Asteroids (PHAs)
  
  

Near-Earth objects
Planetary defense
Space hazards